The 2022 European Junior & U23 Weightlifting Championships (49th in Junior and 13th in U23) took place in Durrës, Albania from 15 to 25 October 2022.

Team ranking

Juniors

Men

Women

Under-23

Men

Women

Medal table

Big
Ranking by Big (Total result) medals

Big and Small
Ranking by all medals: Big (Total result) and Small (Snatch and Clean & Jerk)

Participating nations 
342 athletes from 39 nations.

 (12)
 (23)
 (6)
 (9)
 (3)
 (2)
 (8)
 (3)
 (12)
 (4)
 (1)
 (23)
 (6)
 (22)
 (11)
 (11)
 (9)
 (8)
 (3)
 (5)
 (4)
 (11)
 (1)
 (4)
 (4)
 (1)
 (7)
 (4)
 (5)
 (28)
 (22)
 (4)
 (7)
 (1)
 (12)
 (5)
 (1)
 (18)
 (22)

References

External links
European Weightlifting Federation
Start book
Results
Results book

European Junior & U23 Weightlifting Championships
European Junior and U23 Weightlifting Championships
European Junior and U23 Weightlifting Championships
International weightlifting competitions hosted by Albania
European Junior and U23 Weightlifting Championships
European Junior and U23 Weightlifting Championships